The US Sabot is an American pram sailboat that was designed by Charles McGregor as a one-design racer and first built in 1939.

The design is a development of McGregor's Sabot, based upon the plans published in The Rudder magazine in 1939. The basic Sabot design has been widely adapted and other derivations include the leeboard-equipped Naples Sabot, as well as the daggerboard-equipped El Toro, Wind'ard Sabot and the Australian Holdfast Trainer.

Production
The boat was originally intended for home construction from wood, by amateur builders. The design was later mass-produced by W. D. Schock Corp and Catalina Yachts in the United States, but it is now out of production.

Design
The US Sabot is a recreational sailing dinghy. The early versions were built from plywood, while later production boats were made with hand-laid fiberglass hulls over cores, providing positive flotation. The boat has a cat rig, a squared pram stem, a nearly-plumb transom, a transom-hung rudder controlled by a tiller and a retractable square daggerboard. It displaces .

Catalina-produced Sabots have tapered fiberglass masts and anodized aluminum booms.

With the daggerboard removed it may be sailed in shallow water, beached or ground-transported on a trailer or automobile rooftop.

Operational history
At one time the boat had a class club that organized racing events, the US Sabot Class Association, but by early 2013 its website had been taken down and it seems to be no longer active.

A 2013 review on boat.com noted that the design is, "the perfect first boat for the beginning sailor and popular with junior sailing programs for its simplicity and safety. Equipped with the racing package, the Sabot offers all the sail controls of a larger boat, so learning sailors can develop the full range of sail trimming skills."

Lynn Boats described the Catalina-made US Sabot as, "the perfect first boat for the beginning sailor. Simplicity and safety make the U.S. Sabot popular with junior programs ... The U.S. Sabot is built to withstand the tough use of a learning sailor."

See also
List of sailing boat types

Related development
El Toro (dinghy)
Holdfast Trainer
Naples Sabot
Sabot (dinghy)

Similar sailboats
Optimist (dinghy)

References

External links

Photo of a US Sabot
Photo of US Sabots racing

Dinghies
1930s sailboat type designs
One-design sailing classes
Sailboat type designs by Charles McGregor
Sailboat types built by Catalina Yachts
Sailboat types built by W. D. Schock Corp